The PowerBook 160 is a portable computer that was released by Apple Computer along with the PowerBook 180 on October 19, 1992 and the PowerBook 165 variants were released the following year. At the time, it constituted the mid-range model replacing the previous PowerBook 140 in processing power. The PowerBook 160 was sold until August 16, 1993.

Basic features
Its case design is the same as that of the PowerBook 180, but it shipped with the less powerful 25 MHz Motorola 68030 CPU and no FPU, identically to the low-end 145. The 160 and the 180 were the first PowerBooks to add an external color video port like the Macintosh Portable before it, as well as increasing the maximum RAM to 14 MB. Both PowerBooks introduced a new power saving feature which allowed their processors to run at a slower 16 MHz rate, the same speed as the original 140. The PowerBook 160 had a 40MB SCSI hard disk drive, configurable to 80 or 120MB.

PowerBook 165 (August 1993 – July 1994)
The 165, which was introduced on August 16, 1993, added a 33 MHz processor and larger standard hard drive. Along with the PowerBook 145B, this would be the last of the true 100 series PowerBooks and the last Apple laptop to include two serial (printer and modem) ports. After the 165 was discontinued on July 18, 1994, its entry level descendant, the PowerBook 150, would continue to be sold until October 14, 1995, and though it used the 140 case design, its internals were actually based on the PowerBook Duo and PowerBook 190, a 100-series PowerBook in name only as it used the PowerBook 5300's motherboard and case as well.

PowerBook 165c (February – December 1993)
Introduced on February 10, 1993, the 165c (pictured) was identical to the 165, except that it included a 68882 FPU and had a passive matrix color LCD capable of displaying 256 colors. It was Apple's first PowerBook with a color display. As a result of the thicker color display, the exterior case lid was redesigned, more closely resembling that used on the PowerBook Duo series. The PowerBook 180c used the same case modification.The 165c was discontinued on December 13, 1993.

Specifications

Timeline

References

180
68k Macintosh computers